James Greene, born James Thomas Nolan, (December 1, 1926 – November 9, 2018) was an American film, theater and television character actor. Greene was best known to television audiences for his recurring role as Councilman Fielding Milton, the oldest member of the fictional Pawnee city council on Parks and Recreation, as well as his starring role as Davey McQuinn the elevator operator on The Days and Nights of Molly Dodd, which aired for five seasons on NBC and Lifetime from 1987 to 1991. He also had a recurring role as Uncle Moodri in the Fox Network science fiction TV series Alien Nation.

Early life
Greene was born James Nolan in Lawrence, Massachusetts, on December 1, 1926, to Tim and Martha Nolan. He graduated from Emerson College in Boston in 1950. Greene then became an original, founding member of Elia Kazan's Lincoln Center Repertory Company in New York City.

Career
In 1951, Greene made his Broadway debut in Romeo and Juliet, starring Olivia de Havilland, as a chorus member. He appeared in 22 Broadway plays and productions between 1951 and 1991, as well as 29 off-Broadway plays. His Broadway credits included the original Broadway debut productions of Inherit the Wind in 1955; The Changeling, also helmed by Elia Kazan, in 1964; and Foxfire, opposite  Jessica Tandy and Hume Cronyn, in 1982. He also appeared in the Broadway revivals of You Can't Take It With You in both the 1965 and 1967 productions, as well as The Iceman Cometh in 1985, in which he co-starred with Jason Robards. His last Broadway appearance was in David Hirson's play La Bête in 1991.

In later years, he became known for playing Councilman Fielding Milton, the oldest member of the fictional Pawnee city council on Parks and Recreation. Previously, he starred as Davey McQuinn the elevator operator on The Days and Nights of Molly Dodd, which aired for five seasons on NBC and Lifetime from 1987 to 1991.

Personal life
In the 1960s, Green was married to actress Betty Miller. At the time of his death, he had been married to Elsbeth M. Collins for 34 years.

Death
Greene died on November 9, 2018, in Los Angeles, California, at the age of 91.

Filmography

References

External links

1926 births
2018 deaths
American male television actors
American male film actors
American male stage actors
Emerson College alumni
People from Lawrence, Massachusetts
People from Los Angeles
20th-century American male actors